WOW #1s: Yellow is a two-disc compilation album of 30 songs heralded as the biggest Christian hits of 2005-2010. It debuted at No. 9 on the Billboard Top Christian Albums chart.

Track listing

Disc one
"God with Us" - MercyMe
"Give Me Your Eyes" - Brandon Heath
"The Motions" - Matthew West
"Praise You in This Storm" - Casting Crowns
"Cry Out to Jesus" - Third Day
"The Words I Would Say" - Sidewalk Prophets
"There Will Be a Day" - Jeremy Camp
"Revelation Song" - Phillips, Craig and Dean
"Held" - Natalie Grant
"How Great Is Our God" - Chris Tomlin
"My Savior My God" - Aaron Shust
"I Am" - Mark Schultz
"Cinderella" - Steven Curtis Chapman
"Here I Am to Worship" - Michael W. Smith
"What Faith Can Do" - Kutless

Disc two
"Never Going Back to Ok" - The Afters
"City on Our Knees" - TobyMac
"Free to Be Me" - Francesca Battistelli
"By Your Side" - Tenth Avenue North
"The Lost Get Found" - Britt Nicole
"Washed by the Water" - Needtobreathe
"The Last Night" - Skillet
"I'm Not Alright" - Sanctus Real
"I Need You to Love Me" - BarlowGirl
"This Is Your Life" - Switchfoot
"Me and Jesus" - Stellar Kart
"Every Time I Breathe" - Big Daddy Weave
"Hide" - Joy Williams
"Everlasting God" - Lincoln Brewster
"Everything You Ever Wanted" - Hawk Nelson

See also
 WOW series

References

External links
 WOW #1s official website
 WOW Hits online

WOW series albums
2011 compilation albums